Reboot (stylized as REBOOT) is the third and final studio album by South Korean girl group Wonder Girls. It was released on August 3, 2015, through JYP Entertainment. The Wonder Girls were more involved in the composition of this album, with each member having writing and/or production credits on at least one song; each song has credits for at least one member. This is the first album in years to feature member Sunmi and the first since the departure of members Sunye and Sohee. The album musically conveys a 1980s-inspired style, incorporating genres including synthpop, hip hop, pop rock and dance-pop. 

Reboot was met with critical acclaim from music critics who praised its concept and musical styles. Billboard named the record the best K-pop album of 2015 and the fourth best K-pop album of the 2010s. Commercially, Reboot charted at number five on the Gaon Album Chart and number two on the Billboard World Albums. Its lead single, "I Feel You", was released on August 2, 2015.

Background and composition 
On June 24, 2015, it was reported that member Sunmi would return to the group after her departure in February 2010. On July 20, it was confirmed that members Sohee and Sunye had officially withdrawn from the group. The same day, JYP Entertainment announced the return of the Wonder Girls with a new band concept. For this concept, Sunmi plays bass guitar, Yubin plays drums, Hyelim plays guitar, and Yeeun plays piano. Individual teasers of the members playing their respective instruments began being released on July 20. Despite the concept, none of the members actually recorded instrumentals for the album, though they learned to play the instruments and performed songs with their instruments live. Only Yeeun already knew how to play her instrument, the piano, prior to the lead up to the comeback. Both the main single "I Feel You" and its music video are heavily inspired by 1980s music, similar to the group's 2008 single "So Hot".

Singles and promotion
On July 29, a promotional video for the release of Reboot was released on YouTube. "I Feel You" served as the lead single for the album, being released on August 2. It was accompanied by a music video directed by Lumpens, which premiered on the same day on JYP Entertainment's YouTube channel. It takes place in 1987 and shows each member playing her own instrument and also solo scenes. It is their first single since Sunye's and Sohee's departures and their first single since 2008's "Nobody" to feature Sunmi. The song was promoted on major South Korean music shows, starting on August 8 on KBS's Music Bank; on those shows, they also performed other tracks from the album, including "Candle", "Back", and "Rewind". They also appeared on variety shows, including MBC every1's Weekly Idol. In addition, the group appeared on various radio shows.
The songs "Candle" (featuring Paloalto) and "Rewind" had dance practice videos released on YouTube on August 11 and 20, respectively.

Reception

Critical reception
Reboot received critical acclaim; it was ranked number one on Billboards list of the 10 Best K-pop Albums of 2015 with editor Jeff Benjamin praising the record's thematic concept: "Reboot showcases the importance of a concept and what happens when an act believes in that concept. [...] It’s that type of dedication to your concept, nay art, that makes for a body of work that rises above the rest. As previously mentioned, this year was filled with a spectacular amount of K-pop album releases, but the best comes when the act fully embraces what makes them unique." iTunes Japan named it the best K-pop album of the year while Korean music webzine Idology ranked it the year's third best album, with critic Squib writing that "What the Wonder Girls are rebooting here is not their careers, but a 'real taste of K-pop'." Billboard named Reboot the fourth best K-pop album of the 2010s decade in 2019, hailing the LP as a "testament to the power of pre-established musical genres as a transformative means of expressing oneself". They remarked that it's not a "rehash", "it's a reboot."

Commercial performance
Commercially, Reboot underperformed in comparison to the group's earlier albums. It debuted at number five on the Gaon Album Chart, selling 12,789 copies by August 2016. In the United States, the album debuted at number 2 on the Billboard US World Albums chart, becoming their best charting album on that chart. It also peaked at number twenty-five on US Heatseekers Albums. 

The main single, "I Feel You", charted at number one on eight major South Korean music streaming charts during the week of its release. It peaked at number three on the country's comprehensive Gaon Digital Chart in the week ending on August 15, 2015.

Track listing

Charts

Weekly charts

Monthly charts

Release history

References

External links 
 

Wonder Girls albums
2015 albums
Dance-pop albums by South Korean artists
Korean-language albums
JYP Entertainment albums
Pop rock albums by South Korean artists
Synth-pop albums by South Korean artists